The 2011 European Diving Championships was the secondedition of the European Diving Championships and took part from 8–13 March 2011 in Turin, Italy. For the second time, the event was held separately from the European Swimming Championships. The event was held on Monumentale Diving Stadium. The former capital of Italy was hosting European Diving Championships for the third time after 1954 and 2009. The 2011 Championships were also an event within the frame of the 150-year celebrations of the unification of Italy. A total of ten disciplines was on the schedule. Additionally, there was a team event on the first day of competition.

Events

Results

Men

Women

Mixed

Medal table

Participating nations
103 athletes from 22 nations competed.

  (1)
  (5)
  (1)
  (3)
  (5)
  (3)
  (10)
  (4)
  (6)
  (12)
  (2)
  (3)
  (3)
  (3)
  (3)
  (11)
  (1)
  (2)
  (3)
  (6)
  (9)
  (9)

References

External links 
 

2011
European Diving
European Diving Championships
International aquatics competitions hosted by Italy
Diving competitions in Italy
Sports competitions in Turin